The sea pineapple (Halocynthia roretzi) is an edible ascidian (sea squirt) consumed primarily in Korea, where it is known as meongge (멍게), and to a lesser extent in Japan, where it is known as  or .

Sea pineapples are known for both their peculiar appearance, described by journalist Nick Tosches as "something that could exist only in a purely hallucinatory eco-system" and their peculiar taste, described as "something like iodine" and "rubber dipped in ammonia". However, aficionados claim that the taste is well suited to serving with sake. The flavor has been attributed to an unsaturated alcohol called cynthiaol, which is present in minute quantities.

Sea pineapples live in shallow water, usually attached to rocks and artificial structures, an example of marine biofouling.

Aquaculture of sea pineapples first succeeded in 1982, when 39 metric tons were produced in Korea. Production reached a peak of 42,800 tons in 1994. The FAO estimates that total world sea pineapple production in 2006 was 21,500 tons, worth around US$18 million. Of this, 16,000 tons were cultivated in Japan, including 12,163 tons in Miyagi prefecture alone.

Culinary uses 

In Korea, sea pineapple is mostly eaten raw as meongge-hoe with vinegared gochujang, but it is also often pickled (meongge-jeot) or used to add flavor to kimchi.

In Japan, sea pineapple is most commonly eaten raw as sashimi, simply by slicing the animal vertically, removing the internal organs and serving them with vinegared soy sauce. It is also sometimes salted, smoked, grilled, deep-fried, or dried.

See also
 Sea squirts as food

References

Stolidobranchia
Japanese seafood
Korean cuisine
Animals described in 1884
Japanese cuisine